The Broken River, a minor inland perennial river of the Goulburn Broken catchment, part of the Murray–Darling basin, is located in the Alpine and Northern Country/North Central regions of the Australian state of Victoria. The headwaters of the Broken River rise in the western slopes of the Victorian Alps, near Bald Hill and descend to flow into the Goulburn River near Shepparton. The river is impounded by the Nillahcootie Dam to create Lake Nillahcootie and Benalla Dam to create Lake Benalla.

Location and features

The river rises below Bald Hill on the western slopes of the Victorian Alps, within the Mount Buffalo National Park in the Shire of Mansfield. The river descends  over its  course.

When at maximum capacity, the Broken River is the fastest flowing river in Australia.

It was the location of the Battle of Broken River.

Etymology
In the local Aboriginal language, Ngurai-illam-wurrung, the river at its junction with the Goulburn River is named Marangan, meaning "deep pond, lagoon".

The origin of the river's current name is originally thought to be derived from the fact that in dry seasons the river bed is broken into a series of water holes.

See also

References

Goulburn Broken catchment
Rivers of Hume (region)
Tributaries of the Goulburn River